Ramzan Iznaurovich Tsutsulayev (born 27 May 1972) is a Russian professional football coach and a former player. He works as an assistant coach with FC Akhmat Grozny.

Playing career
He made his professional debut in the Soviet Second League in 1990 for FC Terek Grozny.

He made his Russian Football National League debut for FC Erzu Grozny on 22 April 1993 in a game against FC Spartak Anapa.

Honours
 Russian Cup winner: 2004.

References

1972 births
Sportspeople from Grozny
Living people
Association football goalkeepers
Soviet footballers
Russian footballers
Russian football managers
FC Akhmat Grozny players
FC Anzhi Makhachkala players
FC Angusht Nazran players
FC Kristall Smolensk players
FC KAMAZ Naberezhnye Chelny players